Kenneth Saul Rogoff (born March 22, 1953) is an American economist and chess Grandmaster. He is the Thomas D. Cabot Professor of Public Policy and professor of economics at Harvard University.

Early life 
Rogoff grew up in Rochester, New York. His father was a professor of radiology at the University of Rochester.

Rogoff received a BA and MA from Yale University summa cum laude in 1975, and a PhD in Economics from the Massachusetts Institute of Technology in 1980.

Chess 
At sixteen Rogoff dropped out of high school to concentrate on chess. At that time he met Bobby Fischer, who was impressed by Rogoff's "self-assured style and his knowing exactly what he wanted over the chessboard". He won the United States Junior Championship in 1969 and spent the next several years living primarily in Europe and playing in tournaments there. However, at eighteen he made the decision to go to college and pursue a career in economics rather than to become a professional player, although he continued to play and improve for several years afterward. Rogoff was awarded the IM title in 1974, and the GM title in 1978. He was 3rd in the World Junior Championship of 1971 and finished 2nd in the US Championship of 1975, which doubled as a Zonal competition, a half point behind Walter Browne; this result qualified him for the 1976 Interzonal at Biel where he finished 13–15th. In other tournaments, he drew for first at Norristown in 1973 and at Orense in 1976. He has also drawn individual games against former world champions Mikhail Tal and Tigran V. Petrosian. In 2012 he drew a blitz game with the world's highest rated player Magnus Carlsen.

Career 
Early in his career, Rogoff served as an economist at the International Monetary Fund (IMF), and at the Board of Governors of the Federal Reserve System.

Rogoff was the Charles and Marie Robertson Professor of International Affairs at Princeton University.

In 2002, Rogoff was in the spotlight because of a dispute with Joseph Stiglitz, former chief economist of the World Bank and 2001 Nobel Prize winner. After Stiglitz criticized the IMF in his book, Globalization and Its Discontents, Rogoff replied in an open letter. He is also a regular contributor to Project Syndicate since 2002.

2008 near-meltdown 
Fellow economist Alan Blinder credits both Rogoff and Carmen Reinhart with describing highly relevant aspects of the 2008 financial institution near-meltdown and resulting serious recession.

In a normal recession such as 1991 or 2000, the Keynesian tools of tax cuts and infrastructure spending (fiscal stimulus), as well as lowered interest rates (monetary stimulus), will usually right the economic ship in a matter of months and lead to recovery and economic expansion.  Even the serious recession of 1982, which Blinder states "was called the Great Recession in its day," fits comfortably within this category of a normal recession which will respond to the standard tools.

By contrast, the 2008 near-meltdown destroyed parts of the financial system and left other parts reeling and in serious need of de-leveraging.  Large amounts of governmental debt, household debt, corporate debt, and financial institution debt were left in its wake.  And because of this debt, the normal tools of tax cuts and increased infrastructure spending were somewhat less available and/or politically difficult to achieve. (Fiscal policy at times even ended up becoming pro-cyclical, which it was in some European countries under austerity policies.) In the United States, economist Paul Krugman argued that even the combination of the Oct. 2008 bailout plus the Feb. 2009 bailout was not big enough, although Blinder states that they were large compared to previous bailouts.  And, since interest rates were already near zero, the standard monetary tool of lowering rates was not going to provide much help.

Recovery from what Blinder terms a Reinhart-Rogoff recession may require debt forgiveness, either directly, or implicitly through encouraging somewhat higher than normal rates of inflation.  "Not your father’s recovery policies," writes Blinder.

During the 2010 United Kingdom general election, Rogoff contributed to an open letter to The Sunday Times endorsing the Conservative Party and Shadow Chancellor of the Exchequer George Osborne's demands for greater austerity during the European debt crisis.

Criticism and controversy 
In April 2013, Rogoff was at the center of worldwide attention with Carmen Reinhart (coauthor of the book This Time is Different) when their widely cited study "Growth in a Time of Debt" was shown to contain computation errors which critics claim undermine its central thesis that too much debt causes recession. An analysis by Thomas Herndon, Michael Ash and Robert Pollin argued that "coding errors, selective exclusion of available data, and unconventional weighting of summary statistics led to serious errors that inaccurately represent the relationship between public debt and GDP growth among 20 advanced economies in the post-war period." Their calculations demonstrated that some high debt countries grew at 2.2 percent, rather than the  percent figure initially cited by Reinhart and Rogoff.  Rogoff and Reinhart claimed that their fundamental conclusions were accurate after correcting the coding errors detected by their critics. They disavowed their claim that a 90% government debt-to-GDP ratio is a specific tipping point for growth outcomes. The subject remains controversial, because of the political ramifications of the research, though in Rogoff and Reinhart's words "[t]he politically charged discussion ... has falsely equated our finding of a negative association between debt and growth with an unambiguous call for austerity."

Memberships 

2004: Council on Foreign Relations
Economic Advisory Panel of the Federal Reserve.
National Academy of Sciences
American Academy of Arts and Sciences
2008: Group of Thirty.

Publications 
His book This Time Is Different: Eight Centuries of Financial Folly, which he co-authored with Carmen Reinhart, was released in October 2009.

In The Curse of Cash, published in 2016, he urged that the United States phase out the 100-dollar bill, then the 50-dollar bill, then the 20-dollar bill, leaving only smaller denominations in circulation.

See also
 List of Jewish chess players

References

External links 
 Kenneth Rogoff at Harvard University Department of Economics
 Column archive at Project Syndicate
 
 
 
 
 
 On Point with Tom Ashbrook Thursday, November 15, 2007, show titled Where's the Economy Headed?
 , Nicholas Rugoff, The Politic, May 1, 2010
 Open Letter to Joseph Stiglitz

 

20th-century American economists
20th-century American Jews
21st-century American economists
21st-century American Jews
1953 births
American chess players
Center for Global Development
Chess grandmasters
Economists from New York (state)
Fellows of the American Academy of Arts and Sciences
Fellows of the Econometric Society
Group of Thirty
Harvard University faculty
Institute for New Economic Thinking
International finance economists
Jewish chess players
Living people
Members of the United States National Academy of Sciences
New Keynesian economists
Princeton University faculty
Scientists from Rochester, New York
Yale University alumni